Kabeiro christianae is a species of sea slug, a dendronotid nudibranch, a marine gastropod mollusc in the family Dotidae.

Distribution
This species was described from Maricaban Strait, Luzon, Philippines. It is also known from Bali, Indonesia.

Description
The body of this dendronotid nudibranch is translucent, with longitudinal stripes of brown pigment on the sides and back. The cerata are irregular in shape with large transparent pseudobranchs on the inner faces. The maximum length of this species is 25 mm.

EcologyKabeiro christianae'' is found on colonies of a Sertulariid hydroid.

References

Dotidae
Gastropods described in 2015